The fifth and final season of Yu-Gi-Oh! Duel Monsters, created by Kazuki Takahashi, aired in Japan on TV Tokyo from December 24, 2003, to September 29, 2004. In the United States, the season aired from August 27, 2005, to June 10, 2006, on Kids' WB and broadcast under the Grand Championship (episodes 1–14) and Dawn of the Duel subtitles.

The season was formerly licensed by 4Kids Entertainment in North America and other English-speaking countries and territories, and was formerly distributed by Funimation on Region 1 home video, and also distributed by Warner Bros. Television Animation on US television when it aired on The WB, from the Kids' WB! Lineup, also in North America. It is now licensed and distributed by 4K Media, Inc.

The first fourteen episodes follow an original story arc in-which Kaiba hosts a new tournament that is secretly being sabotaged by a skilled duelist named Zigfried, who uses his hacking skills in an attempt to enact revenge against Kaiba. The rest of the season focuses on The Pharaoh battling Yami Bakura, while Yugi and his friends travel the memory world to discover the Pharaoh's real name.

Episode list

Notes

2003 Japanese television seasons
2004 Japanese television seasons
Duel Monsters (season 5)